Jagged Little Thrill is the third studio album by American R&B group Jagged Edge. It was released by So So Def and Columbia on June 26, 2001, in the United States. The album's name is a spin on Alanis Morissette's album Jagged Little Pill (1995). The album debuted at number 3 on the Billboard 200 with first-week sales of 215,000 copies in the US, outranking their previous album, J.E. Heartbreak (1999) which had peaked at number eighth on the chart; the album is the group's highest peaking album to date (tied with Hard). However, it was not as successful as the group's previous album, though still successful; achieving Platinum status by the Recording Industry Association of America (RIAA). Jagged Little Thrill has sold 1.5 million copies in the US.

Three singles from the album was released. Lead single "Where the Party At" featuring rapper Nelly reached number three on the Billboard Hot 100, becoming the group's second top ten single, and became the band's third chart topper on Billboards Hot R&B/Hip-Hop Singles & Tracks. Follow-up "Goodbye" became the first single of the group to not reach the Top 40 on the Billboard Hot 100, but reached the top 20 on the Hot R&B/Hip-Hop Singles & Tracks chart. A remade version of the song "I Got It," entitled "I Got It 2" featuring Nas, served as the third and final single from the album.

Track listing

Charts

Weekly charts

Year-end charts

Certifications

References

External links

2001 albums
Jagged Edge (American group) albums
Albums produced by Bryan-Michael Cox
Albums produced by Jermaine Dupri